This is a list of notable restaurant chains in the Philippines. A restaurant chain is a set of related restaurants with the same name in many different locations that are either under shared corporate ownership (e.g., McDonald's in the United States) or franchising agreements. Typically, the restaurants within a chain are built to a standard format through architectural prototype development and offer a standard menu and/or services.

List

Current
{| class="wikitable sortable"
|-
!Restaurant chain
!Type 
!data-sort-type=number|Year started
!Owned by
!class=unsortable|Background / Notes
|-
|Cabalen ||Buffet || 1986 || Cabalen Group of Companies ||
|-
|Chowking ||Fast food || 1985 || Jollibee Foods Corporation ||
|-
|Congo Grille ||Casual dining || 1999 || Congo Grille Bar & Restaurant ||
|-
|Dencio's ||Casual dining || 1991 || Max's Group ||
|-
|Bacolod Chicken Inasal ||Fast food ||	1993 || Beaming Dreams Corporation ||
|-
|Greenwich Pizza ||Fast food || 1971 || Jollibee Foods Corporation ||
|-
|Jollibee ||Fast food || 1978 || Jollibee Foods Corporation || Fast food which serves American-influenced Filipino cuisine. An off-shoot of a Magnolia ice cream parlor franchise established by Tony Tan Caktiong in 1975.
|-
|KFC ||Fast food || 1967 || Yum! Brands|| American fast food chain.
|-
|Mang Inasal ||Fast food || 2003 || Jollibee Foods Corporation ||
|-
|Max's Restaurant ||Casual dining || 1945 || Max's Group ||
|-
|McDonald's ||Fast food || 1981 || Golden Arches Development Corporation || American fast food chain. Master franchise in the Philippines is owned by a local company associated with George Yang.
|-
|Tokyo Tokyo ||Fast food || 1985 || One Food Group ||
|-
|Yellow Cab Pizza || Fast food || 2001 || Max's Group ||
|-
|Pancake House || Casual dining || 1974 || Max's Group ||
|-
|Teriyaki Boy || Casual dining || 2001 || Max's Group ||
|-
|Jamba Juice || Fast food || 2011 || Max's Group ||
|-
|Krispy Kreme || Fast food || 2006 || Max's Group ||
|-
|Sizzlin' Steak || Casual dining || - || Max's Group ||
|-
|Teddy’s Bigger Burgers
|Burger chain
||2014
||
|Hawaiian fast food chain founded by Ted Tsakiris and Rich Stula. It was brought to the country by Sumo Burger Global Inc. via a licensing agreement.
|-
|Tropical Hut
|Fast food
||1962
||Mercury Group of Companies 
|
|-
|Shakey's Pizza
|Casual dining
|1975
|
|First pizza chain in the United States. It began in the country under the ownership of San Miguel Corporation.
|-
|Popeyes
|Fast food
|2019
|
|Multinational chain of fried chicken fast food restaurants founded by Al Copeland. Closed its Philippine branches in 2007 due to a conflict with its local franchise holder, but later returned in 2019 to re-open seven stores.
|-
|Burger King
|Fast food
|1997
|Jollibee Foods Corporation
|American-based multinational chain of hamburger fast food restaurants.
|-
|Gerry's Grill
|Casual dining
|1997
|Gerry Apolinario
|
|-
|Kuya J Restaurant
|Casual dining
|2013
|Kuya J Group Holdings Inc.
|
|-
|Shake Shack
|Fast food
|2019
|SSI Group Inc.
|American fast casual restaurant chain based in New York City. Opened its first branch in the Philippines on May 10, 2019, in Bonifacio High Street, Bonifacio Global City.
|-
|Starbucks
|Coffee chain
|1997
|Rustan Coffee Corporation
|Opened its first store in the Philippines at Ayala Avenue in December

Former
 Burger Machine – now a food stall chain

Notes

References

Philippine
 
Restaurant chains